"I'm Gonna Be (500 Miles)" is a song written and performed by Scottish duo the Proclaimers, and first released as the lead single from their 1988 album Sunshine on Leith. The song reached number 11 in the UK Singles Chart on its initial release and has since become their most popular song worldwide. It was a number one hit in Iceland, then number one in Australia and New Zealand in early 1990.

In 1993, following its appearance in the American film Benny & Joon, the song was released in North America and many other countries around the world. It reached number three on the Billboard Hot 100 in the United States in August 1993, as well as number eight on the Billboard Modern Rock chart and number 25 on the Billboard Adult Contemporary chart; it also reached number four in Canada. In 2007, the Proclaimers re-recorded the song with English comedians Peter Kay and Matt Lucas for the UK's Comic Relief charity telethon, scoring a number one hit in the UK and outperforming their original UK chart run.

"I'm Gonna Be (500 Miles)" has become a live staple at the Proclaimers' concerts. The duo played it at Edinburgh 50,000 – The Final Push at Murrayfield Stadium on 6 July 2005, the final concert of Live 8, to symbolise the conclusion of "The Long Walk to Justice".

Background
The song was mainly written by in August 1987 while waiting to travel to a Hibernian Football Club match in Aberdeen. Reid has said that the band's earnings from the song are about five times the rest of their catalogue combined.

Critical reception
Pan-European magazine Music & Media wrote, "We have to get used to this, the acoustic Scottish duo being supported by a full line-up of instruments. Produced by Pete Wingfield, this highly rhythmic pop song is a taster to the forthcoming LP, Sunshine On Leith."

Later success
Originally recorded and released in 1988, the song's success was initially limited mostly to the United Kingdom and Australia. Later in 1993, it was included as one of the main themes of the 1993 American romantic comedy film Benny & Joon starring Johnny Depp and Mary Stuart Masterson; subsequently, due to the exposure it received through the film, "I'm Gonna Be (500 Miles)" reached the top 3 on the US Billboard Hot 100 chart during the summer of that year.

The song was also used during Matthew's flash mob proposal to April in "Readiness Is All", the ninth season episode of ABC's medical drama Grey's Anatomy. The song was heavily used in the CBS sitcom How I Met Your Mothers Season 2 Episode 17, "Arrivederci, Fiero". The song was stuck on repeat in the Fiero and was the only song Marshall could listen to on road-trips. 

It is sung at the birthday party at the end of The Café, Season 1, Episode 6, "Deal or No Deal".

The song also appears in the Channel 4 series Derry Girls, in Season 2, Episode 6.

The song also plays in the trailer for Ice Age: The Meltdown.

Track listing
All tracks written and composed by Charlie and Craig Reid, except where noted.

7" single
 "I'm Gonna Be (500 Miles)" – 3:37
 "Better Days" – 3:14

12" single
 "I'm Gonna Be (500 Miles)" – 3:37
 "Better Days" – 3:14
 "Teardrops" – 2:33

CD single
 "I'm Gonna Be (500 Miles)" – 3:37
 "Better Days" – 3:14
 "Teardrops" – 2:33
 "I Can't Be Myself" (Merle Haggard) – 2:30

Personnel

 Craig Reid – lead vocals, tambourine
 Charlie Reid – backing vocals, acoustic guitar

Additional personnel

 Jerry Donahue – electric guitar
 Pete Wingfield – keyboards
 Phil Cranham – bass guitar
 Dave Mattacks – drums

Charts

Weekly charts

Year-end charts

Certifications

Comic Relief version

In 2007, the Proclaimers re-recorded the song with Peter Kay and Matt Lucas as their characters Brian Potter from Phoenix Nights and Andy Pipkin from Little Britain respectively. There is a slight change in the title of the song, with the parentheses placed around "(I'm Gonna Be)" rather than "(500 Miles)". The lyrics also include a change, with the words "roll 500 miles" replacing "walk 500 miles", because the characters Brian Potter and Andy Pipkin are both in wheelchairs. "(I'm Gonna Be) 500 Miles" was released as a charity single for Comic Relief immediately following its performance on the Comic Relief 2007: The Big One television show on BBC1 on 16 March 2007. It reached number 3 on the official UK Singles Chart on download sales alone, and one week later reached number 1, where it remained for three weeks. It sold 126,000 copies in its first week, making it the biggest selling number one of the year up to that point. Its sales were double that of the official Comic Relief single by Girls Aloud vs. Sugababes, and their cover of Aerosmith's "Walk This Way". The song ended 2007 as the year's 8th biggest-selling single in the UK. The song was popular in Ireland as well, and peaked at #7 in Irish Singles Chart.

Kay also directed a video clip of the song featuring himself as Brian Potter, Lucas as Andy, David Walliams as Lou, The Proclaimers and an audience of celebrity guests, comprising Johnny Ball, David Beckham, David Bellamy, Dusty Bin, Tony Blackburn, Stan Boardman, Basil Brush, Bob the Builder, Holly Willoughby, Bucks Fizz, Cannon and Ball, Bob Carolgees & Spit the Dog, Jasper Carrott, Keith Chegwin, Jimmy Cricket, Tess Daly, Bobby Davro (referred to in the lyrics), Carol Decker, Sally Dynevor, Lesley Garrett, Andy Gray, Clare Grogan, Paul Henry, Frazer Hines, Siobhan Redmond (credited as "Her off Holby City"), Elton John, The Krankies, Burt Kwouk, Bonnie Langford, Eddie Large, Michael Le Vell, Limahl, Kenny Lynch, Des Lynam, Timmy Mallett, Jennie McAlpine, Bill Oddie, Paul O'Grady, Postman Pat, Wendi Peters, Robert Powell, Rod, Jane and Freddy, Rupert the Bear, Showaddywaddy, Status Quo, Frank Sidebottom, Sonia, Dennis Taylor, David Tennant, Willie Thorne, Kate Thornton, Dave Lee Travis, Owen Newton, Martin Tyler, Roy Walker, Louis Walsh, Pete Waterman, Elton Welsby, June Whitfield, Gary Wilmot, and Bob Wilson. 
Osama bin Laden (then still a fugitive terrorist), Lord Lucan (missing since 1974) and Shergar (a kidnapped race horse) are also falsely credited as appearing in the video.

Track listing
CD single
 "(I'm Gonna Be) 500 Miles" – 3:41
 "I'm Gonna Be (500 Miles)" (1988 Original Version) – 3:37
The enhanced CD and DVD also featured the promotional video for the song and a photo gallery.

Charts

Weekly charts

Year-end charts

Certifications

References

External links
 

1988 singles
1988 songs
1993 singles
2007 singles
British alternative rock songs
Chrysalis Records singles
Comic Relief singles
EMI Records singles
Football songs and chants
Number-one singles in Australia
Number-one singles in Iceland
Number-one singles in New Zealand
Number-one singles in Scotland
The Proclaimers songs
Scotland national football team songs
Song recordings produced by Pete Wingfield
UK Singles Chart number-one singles